Ryan Quinn (born January 22, 1987) is a retired American mixed martial artist. A professional competitor from 2008 until 2017, he competed for Bellator MMA, Titan FC, and CES MMA.

Mixed martial arts career

Early career
Quinn began his MMA career in 2008, he went 2–1 in his first three fights before making his Bellator debut.

Bellator MMA
Quinn made his Bellator debut on April 22, 2010 against Matt Lee at Bellator 15. Quinn won the fight via unanimous decision.

Quinn then went 1–1 in smaller promotions before returning to the promotion and earning a unanimous decision win against Mike Winters at Bellator 39.

In his next bout for the promotion, Quinn faced Brett Oteri at Bellator 48 on August 20, 2011. Quinn defeated Oteri via technical submission due to a rear-naked choke in the first round.

At Bellator 63, Quinn faced Marc Stevens on March 30, 2012. Quinn won the fight by unanimous decision.

Quinn was expected to face Andrew Calandrelli at Bellator 98 on September 7, 2013, however Calandrelli was unable to fight due to a medical issue and was replaced by Brylan Van Artsdalen. Quinn won via submission in the first round.

Quinn then faced Andrew Calandrelli at Bellator 110 on February 28, 2014. Quinn won a unanimous decision.

Quinn faced Waylon Lowe at Bellator 140 on July 17, 2015. He won the fight by submission in the second round.

Quinn faced Saad Awad at Bellator 178 on April 21, 2017. He lost the back-and-forth fight via unanimous decision.

Quinn faced undefeated fighter Marcus Surin on October 20, 2017 at Bellator 185. He won the fight by unanimous decision.

Mixed martial arts record

|-
|Win
|align=center|14–7–1
|Marcus Surin
|Decision (unanimous)
|Bellator 185
|
|align=center|3
|align=center|5:00
|Uncasville, Connecticut, United States
|
|-
|Loss
|align=center|13–7–1
|Saad Awad
|Decision (unanimous)
|Bellator 178
|
|align=center|3
|align=center|5:00
|Uncasville, Connecticut, United States
|
|-
|Win
|align=center|13–6–1
|Matt MacGrath
|Decision (split)
|Z Promotions Fight Night 3: Medicine Hat
|
|align=center|3
|align=center|5:00
|Medicine Hat, Alberta, Canada
|
|-
|Win
|align=center|12–6–1
|Brett Oteri
|KO (punches)
|Blockbuster MMA: The Rematch
|
|align=center|3
|align=center|0:31
|Brockton, Massachusetts, United States
|
|-
|Loss
|align=center|11–6–1
|Alexandr Shabliy
|KO (head kick)
|Akhmat Fighting Show 16: Grand Prix Akhmat 2016
|
|align=center|3
|align=center|0:13
|Grozny, Russia
|
|-
|Win
|align=center|11–5–1
|Waylon Lowe
|Submission (guillotine choke)
|Bellator 140
|
|align=center|2
|align=center|2:47
|Uncasville, Connecticut, United States
|
|-
|Loss
|align=center|10–5–1
|Milan Zerjal
|Submission (rear-naked choke)
|Titan FC 32
|
|align=center|3
|align=center|4:34
|Lowell, Massachusetts, United States
|
|-
|Win
|align=center|10–4–1
|Ryan Sanders
|Decision (unanimous)
|NEF: Fight Night 14
|
|align=center|3
|align=center|5:00
|Lewiston, Maine, United States
|
|-
|Win
|align=center|9–4–1
|Andrew Calandrelli
|Decision (unanimous)
|Bellator 110
|
|align=center|3
|align=center|5:00
|Uncasville, Connecticut, United States 
|
|-
|Win
|align=center|8–4–1
|Brylan Van Artsdalen
|Submission (arm-triangle choke)
|Bellator 98
|
|align=center|1
|align=center|2:34
|Uncasville, Connecticut, United States 
|
|-
|Loss
|align=center|7–4–1
|Abner Lloveras
|Decision (unanimous)
|CES MMA: Proving Grounds
|
|align=center|3
|align=center|5:00
|Lincoln, Rhode Island, United States
|
|-
|Win
|align=center|7–3–1
|Marc Stevens
|Decision (unanimous)
|Bellator 63
|
|align=center|3
|align=center|5:00
|Uncasville, Connecticut, United States 
|
|-
|Loss
|align=center|6–3–1
|Ricardo Funch
|Decision (unanimous)
|Premier Fighting Championship 7
|
|align=center|3
|align=center|5:00
|Amherst, Massachusetts, United States 
|
|-
|Win
|align=center|6–2–1
|Brett Oteri
|Technical Submission (rear-naked choke)
|Bellator 48
|
|align=center|1
|align=center|1:49
|Uncasville, Connecticut, United States 
|
|-
|Draw
|align=center|5–2–1
|Joe McGann
|Draw
|Reality Fighting: Mohegan Sun
|
|align=center|3
|align=center|5:00
|Uncasville, Connecticut, United States 
|
|-
|Win
|align=center|5–2
|Mike Winters
|Decision (unanimous)
|Bellator 39
|
|align=center|3
|align=center|5:00
|Uncasville, Connecticut, United States 
|
|-
|Win
|align=center|4–2
|Kevin Horowitz
|TKO (doctor stoppage)
|UCC 3: Renegades
|
|align=center|2
|align=center|2:52
|Jersey City, New Jersey, United States
|
|-
|Loss
|align=center|3–2
|Ian Stephens
|Decision (unanimous)
|XFC 11: The Next Generation
|
|align=center|3
|align=center|5:00
|Tampa, Florida, United States
|
|-
|Win
|align=center|3–1
|Matt Lee
|Decision (unanimous)
|Bellator 15
|
|align=center|3
|align=center|5:00
|Uncasville, Connecticut, United States 
|
|-
|Loss
|align=center|2–1
|John Bachman
|Submission (kneebar)
|FFP: Untamed 28
|
|align=center|1
|align=center|0:55
|Westport, Massachusetts, United States 
|
|-
|Win
|align=center|2–0
|Travis Coyle
|Decision (unanimous)
|World Championship Fighting 6
|
|align=center|2
|align=center|5:00
|Wilmington, Massachusetts, United States 
|
|-
|Win
|align=center|1–0
|Chris Santacroce
|Submission (rear-naked choke)
|USFL: War in the Woods 2
|
|align=center|1
|align=center|1:29
|Ledyard, Connecticut, United States 
|

See also
 List of current Bellator fighters

References

External links
Ryan Quinn on Facebook
Ryan Quinn on Twitter

American male mixed martial artists
Lightweight mixed martial artists
Mixed martial artists utilizing Brazilian jiu-jitsu
Living people
1987 births
Mixed martial artists from Connecticut
American practitioners of Brazilian jiu-jitsu
People awarded a black belt in Brazilian jiu-jitsu